Tia Blake was the stage name of Christiana Elizabeth Wallman (1952-2015), an American writer and singer.

Life
Wallman was born in Columbus, Georgia, 13 April 1952, and grew up in North Carolina. In 1970 she worked for Farrar, Straus and Giroux in New York for six months, before moving to Paris. In Paris she recorded an album of folk songs at Ossian Studio in 1971. This was released in February 1972 by Société Française de Productions Phonographiques (SFPP) under the title Folk Songs and Ballads: Tia Blake and Her Folk-group.

In 1976, Wallman recorded a number of her own original songs in the Canadian Broadcasting Company studio in Montreal, where she was then living.

In 1979, she worked with Daniel Lavoie performing back vocals during the recording of the Nirvana Bleu album.

Wallman graduated from Smith College in 1989 and became a freelance writer and editor, living in North Carolina. She published two pieces in Granta, the second of which appeared posthumously. She died in Pinehurst, North Carolina, on 17 June 2015. She was buried next to her two brothers, Chris and Peter, in North Hatley, Quebec, Canada.

Works

Discography
 Folk Songs and Ballads: Tia Blake and Her Folk-group (LP), SFPP, Paris, 1972
reissued by Water Music, California, in 2012, together with Paris demos (1973) and CBC Montreal recordings (1976)
 Tia Blake, Paris and Montreal Demos 1973-1976 (EP), Yep Roc Records, 2018.

Bibliography
 We Went to Saigon, Granta, 14 July 2006
 Forbidden Games, Granta, 9 March 2017

References

External links
 Street Hassle: Tia Blake, KZSU, 8 May 2012

1952 births
2015 deaths
American folk singers
American women singer-songwriters
21st-century American writers
21st-century American women writers
20th-century American singers
20th-century American women singers
Musicians from Columbus, Georgia
Writers from Georgia (U.S. state)
Singer-songwriters from North Carolina
Writers from North Carolina
Smith College alumni
Singer-songwriters from Georgia (U.S. state)